James Chen is an American actor. He is best known for portraying Kal on The Walking Dead. Chen also played Samuel Chung on the Netflix series Iron Fist.

Early life and education
Chen was born and raised in New York and is of Chinese descent. After earning a Bachelor of Arts from the University of Pennsylvania, Chen earned a Master of Fine Arts from the Yale School of Drama. He was awarded with the Dexter Wood Luke Memorial Prize for his work there.

Career 
In 2011, he played the recurring character Adrian Sung in the crime series Law & Order: Special Victims Unit. He appeared in The Walking Dead, playing Kal in the shows' sixth through ninth seasons.

In 2015, he co-starred in the LGBT drama Front Cover opposite Jake Choi.

Since 2018 he plays Ian Lim, an FBI Analyst in the CBS drama FBI.

Filmography

Film

Television

References

External links

Living people
20th-century American male actors
21st-century American male actors
American male film actors
Place of birth missing (living people)
Year of birth missing (living people)
American male television actors
American male actors of Chinese descent